Mody Cunningham (June 14, 1882 – December 10, 1969) was an American Major League Baseball pitcher. He played for the Philadelphia Athletics during the  season. He attended the University of South Carolina.

References

Major League Baseball pitchers
Philadelphia Athletics players
Baseball players from South Carolina
1882 births
1969 deaths
Hartford Senators players
Troy Trojans (minor league) players
Reading Pretzels players
Syracuse Stars (minor league baseball) players
Springfield Ponies players
Lynn Shoemakers players
Lynn Fighters players